Kyauktan may refer to several places in Burma:

Kyauktan, Banmauk
Kyauktan, Bhamo
Kyauktan, Kalewa
Kyauktan Township, a township of Yangon Region